Niels Gunther Becker (born 16 June 1942) is a former Australian rules footballer who played with Footscray in the Victorian Football League (VFL). He later went on to become a professor at the Australian National University.

Notes

External links 
		
		
						

Living people
1942 births
Australian rules footballers from Victoria (Australia)
Western Bulldogs players
Braybrook Football Club players
VFL/AFL players born outside Australia
German emigrants to Australia